The Golden Holiday is a 2020 South Korean action comedy film written and directed by Kim Bong-Han, starring Kwak Do-won, Kim Dae-myung, Kim Sang-ho and Kim Hee-won. The film follows a detective who takes his family on a trip to Philippines and becomes a murder suspect, only to become further entangled with a criminal organization as he starts investigating the case with the help of a tourist guide, in order to clear his name. The film co-stars Shin Seung-hwan, Shin Dong-mi and Lee Han-seo. Actors Son Hyun-joo and Jo Jae-yoon make cameo appearances. It is director Kim's third film after The Hero (2013) and Ordinary Person (2017). Filipino actor Mon Confiado makes his South Korean film debut with the film shot mostly in Philippines.

The film was originally scheduled for release on August 19, 2020, but was indefinitely delayed due to resurgence in the COVID-19 cases. It was released theatrically on 29 September 2020.

Synopsis
Hong Byeong-soo, a Daecheon detective, takes his family to Philippines on his 10th anniversary, with the hidden intention of tracking down his old friend Yong-bae who scammed him and got away with it a few years ago. In Manila,  Byeong-soo finds himself framed for a murder and sets out to prove his innocence by investigating his own case with the help of Man-Cheol, a tourist guide. With their investigation not going well, Byeong-soo then discovers Yong-bae in prison and learns about a case surrounding "Yamashita's Gold". As Yong-bae offers him a good share of gold, Byeong-soo becomes embroiled in the case.

Cast
 Kwak Do-won as Hong Byeong-soo
 Yu Jin-Woo as young Hong Byeong-soo
 Kim Dae-myung as Hwang Man-cheol
 Lee Chan-yoo as young Hwang Man-cheol
 Kim Sang-ho as Kim Yong-bae
 Kang Chae-min as young Kim Yong-bae
 Kim Hee-won as Patrick
 Shin Seung-hwan as Park Chun-shik
 Shin Dong-mi as Mi-yeon
 Lee Han-seo as Ji-yoon
 Son Hyun-joo as Detective Kang
 Jo Jae-yoon as Detective Ahn
 Lee Bong-ryun as Bank employee
 Mon Confiado as PLT. Shawn Martinez, Philippine National Police officer.
 Cindy Miranda as Linda
 Loren Burgos as Stella
 Christian Villete as Tambay #1
 Fredie Abao as Tambay #2
 Neil Ryan Sese as Boss

Production and Opening 
The movie was filmed in a location in the Philippines in 2018, and many local residents participated. At that time, the title was 'Package'. More than 80% of the movie was filmed in the Philippines. During filming, we encountered typhoons and heatwaves, and had difficulties in recruiting locations and supplying personnel.

Director Kim Bong-han said that he was inspired by the movie "The Hangover" and thinks it's more of a 'children's commotion' than a noir crime drama. It is said that the main subject of the film, 'Yamashita Gold', was actually read from a book and conceived of the story of the gold left by the former Japanese military in the Philippine sea.

The movie was scheduled to be released in the first half of 2020, but due to the COVID-19 pandemic, it was first postponed to August, and then again to September, the Chuseok holiday. In the process, the editing was revised to focus on the events rather than the emotions of the characters to be suitable for a family movie.

References

External links

2020 films
2020s Korean-language films
2020 action comedy films
South Korean action comedy films
Films about vacationing
Films set in South Chungcheong Province
Films set in the Philippines
Films set in Manila
Films shot in the Philippines
Films shot in Manila
Films postponed due to the COVID-19 pandemic